Huang Entong (黃恩彤, 1801 – 1883), courtesy name Shiqin, was a Chinese statesman and Confucian scholar of the late Qing dynasty. He participated with Keying and Yilibu in the negotiation between China and Britain during the First Opium War in 1842, and attended the signing of Treaty of Nanking.

References

1801 births
1883 deaths
Political office-holders in Guangdong
Political office-holders in Jiangsu
Qing dynasty diplomats
Politicians from Tai'an
Qing dynasty politicians from Shandong